Josephine Ada Omaka (born 29 November 1993) is a Nigerian sprinter and hurdler. She competed at local and international competitions in athletics representing Nigeria.

Career 
Josephine Ada Omaka started her career as a junior sprinter and hurdler in Nigeria where she competes in various local competitions. She won gold medals at the 2011 African Junior Championships and 2010 Summer Youth Olympics at 100 metres. She also participated in the women's 4 × 100 metres relay at the 2012 World Junior Championships held at the Estadi Olímpic Lluís Companys on 13 and 14 July, and also won the 2009 African Junior Championships event in the 100 metres and another silver in the 4 × 100 m relay in 2009 competition with Margaret Benson, Goodness Thomas and Wisdom Isoken. Furthermore, she participated in the African 4 × 400 m relay team that won silver medals at the 2010 Summer Youth Olympics with Nkiruka Florence Nwakwe, Izelle Neuhoff and Bukola Abogunloko.

Achievements

Girls
Track and road events

 
Field events

National Olympic Committees (NOCs), mixed-NOCs teams in the 2010 Summer Youth Olympics

Personal bests
100 metres hurdles – 12.98 s (2009)
100 metres – 11.09 s (2011)
100 metres – 11.40 – +1.3 Lagos (NGR) – 30 April 2010 
100 metres – 11.1h * – +1.0 – Abuja (NGR) – 1 July 2008 
200 metres – 24.55 – Nsukka (NGR) – 21 April 2012 
4 × 100 metres Relay – 44.58 – Estadio Olímpico, Barcelona (ESP) – 13 July 2012 
Medley Relay – 2:06.19 – Singapore (SGP) – 23 August 2010

Season bests 
100 metres – 12.37 _ -0.1 – Sapele (NGR) – 21 May 2016

References

External links
 
 

1993 births
Living people
Nigerian female sprinters
Nigerian female hurdlers
Youth Olympic gold medalists for Nigeria
Youth Olympic gold medalists in athletics (track and field)
21st-century Nigerian women